Teplyk Raion (translit. Teplytskyi raion) was a raion (district) of Vinnytsia Oblast in west-central Ukraine. The administrative center of the district was an urban-type settlement of Teplyk. The raion was abolished and its territory was merged into Haisyn Raion on 18 July 2020 as part of the administrative reform of Ukraine, which reduced the number of raions of Vinnytsia Oblast to six. The last estimate of the raion population was

Settlements
Rural settlements in Teplyk raion included:

Books on Teplyk Raion 
In 2015, Rodovid Press published the book Karabelіvka. The land of Our Ancestors - the Land of Our Heirs by Gennady Romanenko.

In 2016, the State Committee for Television and Radio Broadcasting of Ukraine put Romanenko's book into competition for Ukrainian Book of the Year Presidential Award, in the category "For contribution to the development of Ukrainian Studies".

See also
 Administrative divisions of Vinnytsia Oblast

References

External links

 Teplitskiy region 

Former raions of Vinnytsia Oblast
1930 establishments in Ukraine
Ukrainian raions abolished during the 2020 administrative reform